'Wray' is a surname which may refer to:

The surname Wray is most common in the United States, England, Canada and Australia.

Titles
 The Wray baronets, two extinct titles in the Baronetage of England, including lists of titleholders

Persons
 Albert A. Wray (1858–1924), New York politician and lawyer
 Arthur Wray (1906-1993), Canadian politician
 Bill Wray (born 1956), American cartoonist and landscape painter
 Bill Wray (composer), American musician, composer and producer
 Chester B. Wray (1923-2006), California politician
 Christopher Wray (disambiguation)
 Daniel Wray (1701–1783), English antiquary and Fellow of the Royal Society
 Edward Wray (1589-1658), English courtier and politician
 Emma Wray (born 1965), English actress
 Fawcet Wray (1873-1932), British naval officer
 Fay Wray (1907–2004), Canadian–American actress best known for her starring role in the film King Kong''
 Collin Raye (born Floyd Elliot Wray, born 1960), American country singer-songwriter
 Harmon Wray (c. 1947–2007), American prison reformer, human rights and death penalty activist
 Henry Wray (1826-1900), British Army lieutenant-general and Lieutenant Governor of Jersey
 Jimmy Wray (born 1938), Scottish politician
 John Wray (politician) (born 1971), Texas House of Representatives
 Jon Wray (born 1970), English rugby union and rugby league footballer who played in the 1990s and 2000s
 Larry Randall Wray, professor of Economics at the University of Missouri-Kansas City
 Leonora Wray (1886-1979), Australian golfer often referred to as the "mother" of Australian golf
 Link Wray (1929–2005), American rock and roll musician
 Lud Wray (1894–1967), American football player and coach, and co-founder of the Philadelphia Eagles team
 Lyliana Wray (born 2002), American actress
 Margaret Jane Wray (born 1963), American operatic soprano
 Martha Wray (1739-1788), English medical manufacturer
 Mia Wray (born 1995), Australian pop singer-songwriter
 Michael H. Wray (born 1967), North Carolina politician
 Naomi Wray, Australian geneticist
 Nicole Wray (born 1981), American R&B singer and songwriter
 Scotty Wray (died 2022), American country singer-songwriter
 Taylor Wray (born 1981), Canadian lacrosse player
 Sir William Wray, 1st Baronet, of Ashby (1625–1669), English politician
 Sir William Wray, 1st Baronet, of Glentworth (1555–1617), English politician
 William Fitzwater Wray (d. 1938), cycling journalist
 William Wray (artist) (born 1956), American cartoonist and landscape painter
 William Wray (politician) (1876–1946), American politician in the state of Washington

References